This article lists the results for the sport of Squash in 2012.

2012 PSA World Series
 Tournament of Champions (January 20–26):  Nick Matthew defeated  James Willstrop 8-11, 11-9, 11-5, 11-7.
 North American Open (February 20–25):  James Willstrop defeated  Ramy Ashour  	11-7, 11-8, 11-7.
 El Gouna International (April 8–13):  Ramy Ashour defeated  James Willstrop 12-10, 11-5, 5-2 rtd.
 British Open (May 14–20):  Nick Matthew defeated  Ramy Ashour 11-9, 11-4, 11-8.
 US Open (October 6–12):  Ramy Ashour defeated  Grégory Gaultier 11-4, 11-9, 11-9.
 Hong Kong Open (November 27–December 2):  Ramy Ashour defeated  James Willstrop 11-8, 3-11, 11-7, 11-6.

PSA World Series Finals
PSA World Series Finals at London, England. January 2–6, 2013
 Amr Shabana defeated  Nick Matthew 4-11, 11-2, 11-4, 11-7.

PSA World Championship
PSA World Championship at Doha, Qatar. December 7–14, 2012
 Ramy Ashour defeated  Mohamed El Shorbagy 2-11, 11-6, 11-5, 9-11, 11-8.

2012 WSA World Series
 Kuala Lumpur Open (March 26–31):  Nicol David defeated  Annie Au 11-4, 12-10, 11-9.
 British Open (May 15–20):  Nicol David defeated  Nour El Sherbini 11-6, 11–6, 11-6.
 Malaysian Open (September 12–15):  Raneem El Weleily defeated  Nicol David 12-10, 11-13, 11-6, 11-2.
 US Open (October 7–12):  Nicol David defeated  Raneem El Weleily 14-12, 8-11, 11-7, 11-7.
 Hong Kong Open (November 27–December 2):  Nicol David defeated  Camille Serme 11-9, 11-6, 8-11, 11-7.

WSA World Series Finals
WSA World Series Finals at London, England. January 2–6, 2013
 Nicol David defeated  Laura Massaro 11-3, 11-2, 11-9.

WSA World Championship
WSA World Championship at Grand Cayman, Cayman Islands. December 16–21, 2012
 Nicol David defeated  Laura Massaro 11-6, 11-8, 11-6.

World Team Squash Championships
Women's World Team Championships at Nîmes, France. November 12–17, 2012 
  Egypt,   England,   Malaysia

External links
 World Squash: official website of the World Squash Federation

 
Squash by year